The Roman Catholic Diocese of San Carlos de Ancud (in Latin: Dioecesis Sancti Caroli Anduciae) is a suffragan diocese of the archdiocese of Puerto Montt, in Chile. Its current bishop is Mgr. Juan María Florindo Agurto Muñoz. The retired (emeritus) bishop is Mgr. Juan Luis Ysern de Arce.

History 

The diocese is one of the oldest catholic dioceses in Chile. It was established by Pope Gregory XVI, by means of the Bulla "Ubi Primum" on 1 July 1840. The current Chilean dioceses of Villarrica, Valdivia, Osorno, Puerto Montt, Punta Arenas and the Apostolic Vicariate of Aysén have all been carved out of the original territory of the diocese of San Carlos de Ancud, at different times.

Diocesan statistics

The diocese, which comprises the provinces of Chiloé and Palena, in the Los Lagos region of Chile, covers a territory of 24,283 km² and has 26 parishes. Its estimated catholic population is about 117,000 out of a total population of 152,000. 
The diocesan cathedral ("El Sagrario" parish), is located in the city of Ancud.

Bishops

Bishops of San Carlos de Ancud

 Justo Donoso Vivanco † (3 July 1848  – 19 March 1853 appointed bishop of La Serena)
 Vicente Gabriel Tocornal Velasco † (10 March 1853  – 11 November 1857, died)
 Juan Francisco de Paula Solar Mery † (20 March 1857  – 21 April 1882, died)
 Agustín Lucero Lazcano † (11 December 1886  – 3 December 1897, died)
 Ramón Angel Jara Ruz † (28 April 1898 – 31 August 1909 appointed  bishop of La Serena)
 Pedro Armengol Valenzuela Poblete † (30 June 1910  – 16 December 1916, resigned)
 Luis Antonio Castro Alvarez † (21 February 1918  – 23 October 1924, resigned)
 Abraham Aguilera Bravo † (24 October 1924  – 30 April 1933, died)
 Ramón Munita Eyzaguirre † (22 January 1934  – 29 April 1939 appointed bishop of Puerto Montt)
 Hernán Frías Hurtado † (28 March 1940  – 13 January 1945 appointed bishop of Antofagasta)
 Cándido Rada Senosiáin † (9 June 1945  – 22 December 1949, resigned)
 Osvaldo Salinas Fuenzalida † (3 August 1950  – 15 June 1958 appointed bishop of Linares)
 Alejandro Durán Moreira † (17 April 1959  – 31 March 1966 appointed bishop of Los Angeles)
 Sergio Otoniel Contreras Navia † (21 November 1966  – 25 January 1974 appointed  auxiliary bishop of Concepción)
 Juan Luis Ysern de Arce (13 May 1974 – 15 September 2005, retired)
 Juan Maria Florindo Agurto Muñoz (15 September 2005 succeeded – )

Coadjutor bishop
Juan Maria Florindo Agurto Muñoz, O.S.M. (2001-2005)

Auxiliary bishop
Augusto Klinke Leier (1908-1910), appointed Apostolic Administrator of Valdivia

Other priest of this diocese who became bishop
Teodoro Bernardo Eugenín Barrientos (priest here, 1910-1927), appointed Apostolic Administrator of Valdivia

Parishes 

 El Sagrario, (Cathedral) Ancud
 San Antonio, Chacao
 San Ramón, Nal
 Nuestra Señora del Tránsito, Lliuco
 Patrocinio San José, Quemchi
 Santa María de Loreto, Achao
 Apóstol Santiago, Castro
 Sagrado Corazón, Castro
 San Judas, Curaco de Vélez
 Santos Reyes, Chaulinec
 Nuestra Señora del Rosario, Chelín
 Nuestra Señora de Lourdes, Dalcahue
 San Francisco Javier, Mechuque
 Corazón de María, Quilquico
 Natividad de María, Rilán
 Patrocinio San José, Tenaún
 Nuestra Señora de los Dolores, Volgue
 Nuestra Señora del Perpetuo Socorro, Quenac
 San Carlos, Chonchi
 San Pedro Nolasco, Puqueldón
 Nuestra Señora del Tránsito, Queilén
 San Antonio, Quellón
 San Juan Bautista, Rauco
 Nuestra Señora de los Dolores, Chaitén

External links
Diocese of San Carlos de Ancud at the Catholic-hierarchy website

San Carlos de Ancud
San Carlos de Ancud
San Carlos de Ancud
San Carlos de Ancud, Roman Catholic Diocese of
1840 establishments in Chile